Thyrgis is a genus of moths in the subfamily Arctiinae. The genus was erected by Francis Walker in 1854.

Species
Thyrgis angustifascia Hering, 1925
Thyrgis basipunctata Hering, 1926
Thyrgis childon (Druce, 1885)
Thyrgis constrictifascia (Dognin, 1919)
Thyrgis flavonigra Dognin, 1910
Thyrgis lacryma Dognin, 1919
Thyrgis marginata (Butler, 1876)
Thyrgis militta (Stoll, [1781])
Thyrgis ruscia (Druce, 1895)
Thyrgis tenuifascia Hering, 1930

References

External links

Arctiinae